This is a list of J/24 sailboat championships.

World Championships

See also
Sailing at the 2011 Pan American Games – J/24
Sailing at the 2015 Pan American Games – J/24

References

J/24 competitions